John Wellington Kent, better known by his signature Jack Kent (March 10, 1920 – October 18, 1985), was an American cartoonist and prolific author-illustrator of 40 children's books. He is perhaps best known as the creator of King Aroo, a comic strip often compared to Walt Kelly's Pogo. In addition to his own books, he also illustrated 22 books by other authors.

Born in Burlington, Iowa, Kent dropped out of high school at the age of 15 and began a career as a freelance commercial artist, working in that field until he joined the U.S. Army in 1941.

King Aroo arrives
His first nationally recognized work was King Aroo, which was syndicated and distributed internationally from November 1950 to June 1965. The strip did not become a great commercial success, but was reportedly adored by its loyal fanbase, and praised for its imaginative puns and dialogue.
The early strips were collected in a 192-page book, King Aroo, published as a trade paperback by Doubleday in 1953. The collection had an introduction by Gilbert Seldes. In 2010 IDW began  a complete reprint of King Aroo, with the first volume covering dailies and Sundays from 1950 thru 1952.

He also wrote and drew the seasonal 1968 syndicated Christmas comic strip, Why Christmas Almost Wasn't which was also offered to Newspaper Enterprise Association (NEA) clients.

Also in 1968, and continuing into 1969, he wrote several articles (and illustrated one of them) for Mad. He made a final contribution to Mad in 1977.

He began writing and illustrating children's books in 1968, which he continued doing until his death.

Personal life
According to Bruce Canwell's biographical essay published in IDW's second volume of King Aroo-reprints, Kent married Juliet Bridgman in September 1952; however, the couple divorced only eight months later. In March 1954, Kent married again, this time to June Kilstofte, a reporter who had interviewed him for a magazine article. They remained married until Kent's death. In July, 1955 their only child John Wellington "Jack" Kent Jr. was born.

Living on the banks of the San Antonio River, Kent and his wife June named their home King Aroo's Castle. He died in 1985 from leukemia.

Awards
Jack Kent's book Just Only John received awards from the Chicago Graphics Associates and the Children's Book Clinic. The New York Times named his Mr. Meebles outstanding picture book of the year 1970.

Archives
At the University of Minnesota, the collection Jack Kent Papers spans the years 1953 to 1985 and includes 50 pencil sketches, nine photocopies, 182 blue line illustrations, 251 ink illustrations (some with holograph, paste-ups, separations), two paste-ups for table of contents, eight pencil illustrations with holograph, three ink illustrations with color indications and three watercolor illustrations.

Selected works
 1987 Jack Kent's Valentine Sticker Book 
 1985 The Caterpillar and the Polliwog
 1985 Joey Runs Away 
 1984 Joey
 1984 Jim Jimmy James 
 1984 Round Robin
 1983 Silly Goose
 1982 The Once-Upon-a-Time Dragon
 1981 Jack Kent's Sticker-Fun Drawing Book 
 1981 Little Peep
 1981 The Biggest Shadow in the Zoo 
 1981 The Scribble Monster 
 1980 Knee High Nina
 1979 Floyd, the Tinniest Elephant 
 1979 Hoddy Doddy (collecting three stories: "The Lobsters", "The Clock", and "The Patriot")
 1979 Jack Kent's Hokus Pokus Bedtime Book
 1978 Socks For Supper
 1978 Jack Kent's Cindy Lou and the Witch's Dog
 1978 Piggy Bank Gonzales
 1978 Supermarket Magic: A Sniffy Book (a scratch and sniff book) 
 1977 Jack Kent's Merry Mother Goose
 1976 The Animobile Book
 1976 There's No Such Thing as a Dragon
 1976 Jack Kent's Happy-Ever-After Book
 1975 The Christmas Piñata
 1975 The Egg Book 
 1974 Bremen Town Musicians
 1974 More Fables of Aesop
 1974 Jack Kent's Hop, Skip, and Jump Book: An Action Word Book
 1973 Mrs. Mooley
 1973 Jack Kent's 12 Days of Christmas
 1972 Jack Kent's Fables of Aesop (aka The Fox and the Crow: And 10 Other Tales)
 1972 Dooley and the Snortsnoot
 1971 The Fat Cat: A Danish Folktale
 1971 The Wizard of Wallaby Wallow (aka The Wizard and His Magic Spells) 
 1970 The Blah
 1970 Mr. Meebles
 1970 Jack Kent's Book of Nursery Tales
 1969 Mrs. Mooley
 1969 Mr. Elephant's Birthday Party
 1969 Clotilda (aka Clotilda's Magic) 
 1969 Fly Away Home
 1969 The Grown-Up Day
 1968 Just Only John
 1953 King Aroo (Doubleday)

Other authors
Jack Kent illustrations for other authors
 1985 The Twiddle Twins' Haunted House by Howard Goldsmith
 1985 Q Is for Duck: An Alphabet Guessing Game by Marcia McClintock Folsom and Mary Elting
 1985 Easy As Pie: A Guessing Game of Sayings by Marcia Folsom and Michael Folsom
 1984 Grime Doesn't Pay: Law & Order Jokes compiled by Charles Keller
 1980 Big Bear, Spare That Tree by Richard J. Margolis 
 1979 Laura's Story by Beatrice Schenk de Regniers 
 1978 Janie and the Giant by Sarah Barchas
 1978 The Simple Prince by Jane Yolen 
 1977 More Spaghetti, I Say! by Rita Golden Gelman (later printings after 1987 are illustrated by Mort Gerberg instead of Jack Kent)
 1976 The Magic Carrot Seeds by Carla Stevens
 1976 Seven at One Blow by Freya Littledale
 1976 Why Can't I Fly by Rita Golden Gelman
 1975 I Was Walking Down the Road by Sarah E. Barchas
 1975 How to Make Possum's Honey Bread, Skunk's Chocolate Sprinkle Bread, and Racoon's Raisin Bread, Too by Carla Stevens

Ralph series
The Ralph series about a parrot named Ralph. Written by Bonnie Bishop:
 1979 No One Noticed Ralph
 1979 Ralph Rides Away

Ruth Belov Gross
Jack Kent illustrated books by Ruth Belov Gross
 1983 The Girl Who Wouldn't Get Married
 1982 If You Grew Up with George Washington (later printings are illustrated by Emily Arnold McCully instead of Jack Kent)
 1977 The Emperor's New Clothes retold by Ruth Belov Gross
 1974 The Bremen-town Musicians retold by Ruth Belov Gross

References

External links
University of Minnesota Library Special Collections: Jack Kent Papers: 1953-1985

1920 births
1985 deaths
American children's writers
American children's book illustrators